The 1944 Texas Tech Red Raiders football team represented Texas Technological College—now known as Texas Tech University—as a member of the Border Conference during the 1944 college football season. Led by fourth-year head coach Dell Morgan, the Red Raiders compiled an overall record of 4–7 with a mark of 2–0 in conference play. No Border Conference title was awarded. The team played home games at Tech Field in Lubbock, Texas.

Schedule

References

Texas Tech
Texas Tech Red Raiders football seasons
Texas Tech Red Raiders football